General Todd may refer to:

Henry D. Todd Jr. (1866–1964), U.S. Army major general
John Blair Smith Todd (1814–1872), Union Army brigadier general
Thomas H. Todd III (fl. 1980-2020s), U.S. Army lieutenant general
W. Russell Todd (born 1928), U.S. Army major general

See also
Attorney General Todd (disambiguation)